Ashtown is a commuter railway station in Fingal, Ireland on the Dublin Connolly to Maynooth and Docklands to M3 Parkway commuter services.

It serves Ashtown, Dublin, Ireland and is near the Ashtown roundabout on the Navan Road (R147).

 (formerly Phoenix Park) opened nearby in 2008 but does not replace Ashtown.

The ticket office is open from 06:30 to 16:00, Monday to Friday. It is closed on Saturday and Sunday.

History
The station was opened by the Midland Great Western Railway in 1847 for race specials at the now-demolished Phoenix Park Racecourse. It opened fully on 1 August 1902. Absorbed into the Great Southern Railways by way of the Railways (Great Southern) Preliminary Amalgamation Scheme of 12 November 1924 (SI no. 31 of that year), the station closed in 1934.

The line through the station was then nationalised, passing on to Córas Iompair Éireann as a result of the Transport Act 1944 which took effect from 1 January 1945. Under this management, it reopened briefly in 1979 for the visit of Pope John Paul II to Ireland in order to facilitate the large numbers who attended the open-air mass in the Phoenix Park and reopened permanently on 11 January 1982. It passed on to Iarnród Éireann in 1987.

The footbridge came from Midleton on the Youghal line.

See also
 List of railway stations in Ireland

References

External links

Iarnród Éireann stations in Fingal
Railway stations opened in 1847
Railway stations closed in 1934
Railway stations opened in 1979
Railway stations closed in 1979
Railway stations opened in 1982
1847 establishments in Ireland
Railway stations in Fingal
1934 disestablishments in Ireland
1982 establishments in Ireland
Railway stations in the Republic of Ireland opened in 1847
Railway stations in the Republic of Ireland opened in the 20th century